"Stop" is a song from the 1979 Pink Floyd album, The Wall. It was written by Roger Waters.

Plot
Pink is tired of his life as a fascist dictator and the hallucination ends. Also tired of "The Wall", he accordingly devolves into his own mind and puts himself on trial.

Film version
After "Waiting for the Worms", Pink screams out "stop", where we find him sitting at the bottom of a bathroom stall. He seems to be reading the lyrics from a sheet of paper where a few of the lines come from, at the time, unreleased material written by Waters. The line "Do you remember me / How we used to be / Do you think we should be closer?", comes from "Your Possible Pasts". Other lines come from "5:11AM (The Moment of Clarity)". As Pink finishes the lyrics to "Stop", the security guard seen in the segment for "Young Lust" slowly pushes open the stall door, which leads to the animated intro of "The Trial".

Personnel
Roger Waters – vocals
Bob Ezrin – piano

Further reading

References

Pink Floyd songs
1979 songs
Songs written by Roger Waters
Rock ballads
Song recordings produced by Bob Ezrin
Song recordings produced by David Gilmour
Song recordings produced by Roger Waters